John Ferguson Godfrey,  (born December 19, 1942) is a Canadian educator, journalist and former Member of Parliament.

Background
Godfrey was born in Toronto, Ontario. His father, Senator John Morrow Godfrey (June 28, 1912 – March 8, 2001), was a Canadian pilot, lawyer and politician. John Godfrey graduated from Upper Canada College in 1960. In 1961, he attended the Neuchâtel Junior College in Neuchâtel, Switzerland.

In 1965, he received a Bachelor of Arts degree from Trinity College, University of Toronto and in 1967, he received a Master of Philosophy from Balliol College, Oxford and Doctor of Philosophy (DPhil) from St Antony's College, Oxford in 1975. He worked as an economist, historian and journalist. In the mid-1970s Godfrey was a history professor at Dalhousie University in Halifax. He served as president of the University of King's College from 1977-87. From 1987 to 1991 he was editor of the Financial Post.

Politics 
He was elected to the House of Commons of Canada as the Liberal Member of Parliament (MP) for the Toronto area riding of Don Valley West in the 1993 election, and was re-elected in each subsequent vote until his retirement from federal politics in 2008.

During the 1995 Quebec referendum, Godfrey had an acquaintance perform a psychiatric evaluation of separatist leader Lucien Bouchard.

In 1996, he and fellow Liberal MP Peter Milliken introduced the Godfrey–Milliken Bill a parody of the American Helms–Burton Act. The gesture received extensive media coverage including in the United States, where Godfrey was featured on the CBS program 60 Minutes. From 1996 to 2004, Godfrey served as a Parliamentary Secretary under Prime Minister Jean Chrétien.

Minister of State for Infrastructure and Communities  

In 2003, Paul Martin succeeded Chrétien as Liberal leader and prime minister. Following the subsequent 2004 election, Godfrey, among other key Martin allies, was appointed to the Cabinet in the role of Minister of State for Infrastructure and Communities. In this role, he was primarily responsible for overseeing the "New Deal for Cities", Federation of Canadian Municipalities relationship, and other initiatives in Canadian federal-municipal relations. This role was considered a keystone of Martin's industrial strategy.

Liberal leadership 

On February 3, 2006, CBC Newsworld's Don Newman announced on air that Godfrey was planning a run for the Liberal Party leadership. Godfrey declared his candidacy on Goldhawk Live on March 19, shortly after the rules and convention date were set. Media reaction was positive, but competed with coverage of Ashley MacIsaac, who declared his intention to run to the Halifax Daily News the next day.

In the early stages of the campaign he was recurrently cited as exemplar of intellectualism in the race, being one of three former university professors in the running. Name-recognition remained a challenge, but Godfrey received plaudits in the Canadian blogosphere for his performance in the first all-candidates meeting at the Liberal Party of Alberta convention on April 8.

On April 12, 2006, Godfrey announced his withdrawal from the race, due to concerns about his health. On October 20, 2006, Godfrey announced his support for Bob Rae for the federal Liberal leadership. He made the announcement at the National Press Club, on the occasion of a speech by Rae on the environment.

Leaving politics

Godfrey announced in November 2007 his intention to resign his parliamentary seat on July 1, 2008 and would leave earlier if an election were called before that date. He later delayed his resignation date until August 1. The Conservative Party alleged that the Liberals chose to delay the by-election for financial reasons though Godfrey's office stated that the delay was due to a private members bill Godfrey had worked on not being given Royal Assent until June 26.

On June 17, in a point of order following Question Period, Godfrey gave his resignation speech to the House of Commons.

Headmaster of the Toronto French School

John Godfrey left politics to become  Headmaster of the Toronto French School, an independent school in the Lawrence Park area with two campuses in Toronto. He held the position from 2008 until resigning in June 2014.

The Government of Ontario appointed John Godfrey Special Advisor for Climate Change and Chair of the Government's Climate Action Group in March 2015, positions he held until June 2018.

References

External links
 

1942 births
Living people
Alumni of Balliol College, Oxford
Alumni of St Antony's College, Oxford
Canadian economists
20th-century Canadian historians
Canadian male non-fiction writers
Canadian newspaper editors
Canadian male journalists
Canadian university and college chief executives
Journalists from Toronto
Liberal Party of Canada MPs
Members of the 27th Canadian Ministry
Members of the House of Commons of Canada from Ontario
Members of the Order of Canada
Members of the King's Privy Council for Canada
Politicians from Toronto
Trinity College (Canada) alumni
Academic staff of University of King's College
University of Toronto alumni
Upper Canada College alumni
Writers from Toronto
20th-century Canadian journalists
20th-century Canadian politicians
Academic staff of the Dalhousie University